Total gaseous mercury is a measurement of mercury concentration used in toxicology.

References

Mercury (element)